Moussa Kalisse (born 18 May 1983 in Bodegraven) is a Dutch footballer who plays as a striker. He is currently without a club. He formerly played for Sparta Rotterdam, FC Dordrecht, Excelsior and FCM Târgu Mureş.

References

External links
 Voetbal International profile 

1983 births
Living people
Dutch footballers
Dutch expatriate footballers
Association football forwards
Sparta Rotterdam players
FC Dordrecht players
Excelsior Rotterdam players
Eredivisie players
Eerste Divisie players
Liga I players
Expatriate footballers in Romania
Dutch expatriate sportspeople in Romania
Dutch sportspeople of Moroccan descent
People from Bodegraven
ASA 2013 Târgu Mureș players
Footballers from South Holland